This article is a list of some of the islands that form the British Isles that have an area of one kilometre squared (247 acres) or larger, listing area and population data. The total area of the islands is 314,965 km2 (121,608 sq. mi.). Great Britain accounts for the larger part of this area at 66%, with Ireland accounting for 26%, leaving the remaining 8%—an area of 23,996 km2 (9265 sq. mi.)—comprising thousands of smaller islands. The largest of the other islands are to be found in the Hebrides and the Northern Isles to the north, and Anglesey and the Isle of Man between Great Britain and Ireland. Not included are the Channel Islands which, positioned off the coast of France, are not part of the archipelago.

There are 189 permanently inhabited islands in total:

 Isle of Man: 2
 Republic of Ireland: 62 and part of Ireland
 United Kingdom: 123 plus Great Britain and part of Ireland
 England: 19 and part of Great Britain
 Northern Ireland: 1 and part of Ireland
 Scotland: 97 and part of Great Britain
 Wales: 6 and part of Great Britain

See also 
 British Isles
 List of islands in the Atlantic Ocean
 List of islands of England
 List of islands of Ireland
 List of islands of Scotland
 List of Orkney islands
 List of Outer Hebrides
 List of Shetland islands
 List of islands of the Isle of Man
 List of islands of the United Kingdom
 List of islands of Wales

References 

List
British Isles
Islands by area
Islands

it:Arcipelago britannico#Lista delle isole